The Country Nation World Tour was the ninth headlining concert tour by American country music singer Brad Paisley. The tour was in support of his ninth studio album, Wheelhouse (2013), and tenth studio album, Moonshine in the Trunk (2014). The tour began on May 16, 2014, in Camden, New Jersey, and finished on April 26, 2015, in Anchorage, Alaska.

Background
Days before the tour started Paisley still didn't have a name for the tour. "You should have seen our trucks--it's 10 white semis", "I'm tempted to take a sharpie and write, 'Brad Paisley World Tour on the front of it", Paisley told Billboard Magazine. Additional dates of the tour were announced in November 2014 and began on January 16, 2015, in Morgantown, West Virginia.

The tour was sponsored by Kraft's Cheese & Dairy Brands. To go along with the sponsor, fans were "able to participate in various Kraft-brand activities" like taking photos in the "Cheese Photobooth" and using props for an opportunity to appear during the show on screen.

Opening acts
Leg 1
 Randy Houser
 Charlie Worsham
 Leah Turner
 Dee Jay Silver

Leg 2
 Swon Brothers
 Parmalee

Set list
 "Moonshine in the Trunk"
 "Ticks"
 "American Saturday Night"
 "Southern Comfort Zone"
 "Waitin' on a Woman"
 "Celebrity"
 "This Is Country Music"
 "I'm Still a Guy"
 "She's Everything"
 "Beat This Summer"
 "The Mona Lisa"
 "Then"
 "Online"
 "Four-wheel Park"
 "Mud on the Tires"
 "River Bank"
 "Hot for Teacher" 
 "I'm Gonna Miss Her (The Fishin' Song)"
 "Remind Me"
 "Water"
 "Old Alabama"
Encore
 "Alcohol"

Tour dates

List of festivals and fairs
  This concert was a part of the Tree Town Festival.
  This concert was a part of Chippewa Valley Country Festival.
  This concert was a part of Cheyenne Frontier Days.
  This concert was a part of the North Dakota State Fair.
  This concert was a part of the Cape Blanco Country Music Festival.
  This concert was a part of the We Fest.
  This concert was a part of the New York State Fair.
  This concert was a part of the Stock Show and Rodeo.
  This concert was a part of the Shakey Boots Festival.
  These concerts were part of the Blue Ridge Music Festival.
  This concert was a part of the Farmborough Festival.
  This concert was a part of the Boots and Hearts Music Festival.

References

External links

2014 concert tours
2015 concert tours
Brad Paisley concert tours